Durham Hosiery Mills No. 2–Service Printing Company Building was a historic textile mill building located at Durham, Durham County, North Carolina. It was the remaining section of a one-story brick building constructed by the Durham Hosiery Mills Corporation in 1916. The other section was destroyed by a fire in 1979.  It featured tall segmental arched windows, heavy exposed curved rafter ends in the eaves, and a monitor roof. After 1947, it housed the Service Printing Company.

It was listed on the National Register of Historic Places in 1985. It subsequently was destroyed by fire in 1985.

References

Textile mills in North Carolina
Industrial buildings and structures on the National Register of Historic Places in North Carolina
Industrial buildings completed in 1916
Buildings and structures in Durham, North Carolina
National Register of Historic Places in Durham County, North Carolina